Torn Apart is the fourth and final studio album by the Australian Ska band Area-7. It was released in 2005 via Shock Records.

Track listing
"Torn Apart" 
"Falling Down" 
"Am I Ever Gonna See Your Face Again" 
"Showdown" 
"Time On My Side" 
"Eye To Eye" 
"Big Issue" 
"Don't Talk To Me" 
"Psycho Girl" 
"One Day"

2005 albums
Area-7 albums
Shock Records albums